Seopyeonje ( Hanja: 西便制) is a 1993 South Korean musical drama film directed by Im Kwon-taek, based on the novel of the same name by Yi Chong-jun. It tells the story of a family of traditional Korean pansori singers trying to make a living in the modern world. It is the first South Korean film to draw over one million audiences and has significant influence in reviving popular interest in traditional Korean culture and pansori.

Plot

In a jumak (tavern) on a small pass called Soritjae of Boseong County, South Jeolla Province during the early 1960s, Dong-ho, who is in his 30s, asks a pansori singer at the inn if the road and inn's name, "Road of Music" and "Inn of Music", were named after her singing, which the woman denies. The singer says that they were named after a man called Yu-bong and that she learned singing from the man's adoptive daughter, Song-hwa. Dong-ho requests a song and accompanies her with his drum, recalling his past.

A young Dong-ho is crying in the fields while his mother is looking at Yu-bong singing pansori for the opening ceremony of the local mill. Later that night after the performance, Yu-bong enters the hanok of Dong-ho's mother. The woman greets Yu-bong unaware that Dong-ho has woken up, and the two have sexual intercourse while Dong-ho watches from the side. Yu-bong convinces the woman to elope with him. The couple, Dong-ho, and Song-hwa leave the village and begin their journey. The woman becomes pregnant with Yu-bong's child, but both die from birth complications.

Yu-bong teaches young Dong-ho and Song-hwa the verses to Jindo Arirang. Dong-ho does not exhibit the same singing talent as Song-hwa, but Yu-bong begins to teach Dong-ho the role of a pansori gosu to accompany Song-hwa. Meanwhile, Song-hwa begins to learn the verses to Chunhyangga. While traveling, they meet Yu-bong's friend, a street artist calligrapher. Yu-bong planned on bringing Song-hwa and Dong-ho to see a professional performance of Chunhyangga starring Lee Dong-seong, but the calligrapher expresses lament at Yu-bong's intentions. The calligrapher tells Yu-bong that Korean folk music is no longer a means to make a living as people turn to Western and Japanese songs instead. Yu-bong believes that Pansori is still superior and will become internationally renowned. During the performance, both children are moved to tears. After the performance, Lee stops Yu-bong and asks him for a drink. A long time ago, Lee and Yu-bong were both studying under the same master, but after a scandal between Yu-bong and the master's favorite concubine, Yu-bong was excommunicated from the community. Upon the master's death, he forgave Yu-bong and now Lee is asking Yu-bong to come back to Seoul. Yu-bong, angry and drunk, picks a fight with Lee and others declaring that although he is not a mainstream star, he will prove his value, then he storms out alone.

During autumn many years later, Dong-ho and Song-hwa have both grown up to be young adults. They pick up a job to sing at an event gathering and Song-hwa impresses the male audience with her singing. One man begins to dance and approaches Song-hwa to put money in her bosom, inviting her to join them for drinks. Song-hwa reluctantly obliges. After returning home, Yu-bong slaps Song-hwa for pouring drinks and dishonoring the pansori profession. Dong-ho defends her and tells Song-hwa that since Yu-bong is not their real father and has no right to abuse them in this way. Song-hwa defends Yu-bong and admits that she loves to sing. The three continue their journey and continue to lose jobs due to Yu-bong's rash behavior. Once, while traveling through wheat fields, they break out into Jindo Arirang and begin to dance. While the song progresses, Song-hwa starts to improvise lyrics to the tune, Yu-bong joining in.

While singing on the streets, Song-hwa and Yu-bong sing a duet from Chunhyangga, gathering an audience. However a marching band passing by quickly grabs their audience away drowning out the pansori singing. Yu-bong expresses disgust at the people's tastes in music and leaves. Yu-bong has gone to seek a friend in order to teach Song-hwa new skills. Dong-ho interjects that Song-hwa has no energy to sing, living off of porridge every day due to their poverty. Yu-bong grows furious, stating that a true singer does not sing for money, but rather chases after producing the best sound, which transcends both wealth and fame. Having had enough, Dong-ho packs his belongings and leaves. Song-hwa chases after him, but ultimately decides to stay with Yu-bong.

The contemporary Dong-ho ends his flashback and takes a bus to Osu, where he finds out from a gisaeng that Song-hwa left their establishment 3 years ago as well after waiting for her brother on the porch. Dong-ho travels to a bar and coincidentally meets the old calligrapher on the side of the street. Surprised by this reunion, the two have a drink and the Calligrapher tells Dong-ho that after he left, Song-hwa ceased to sing or eat, worrying Yu-bong greatly.

Yu-bong and the calligrapher were catching up and joking about the aphrodisiac that the calligrapher was taking. Earlier, Yu-bong humiliated himself at a performance earlier and Song-hwa was reluctant to sing either. Yu-bong inquires that if one overdoses on aconite, they would become blind. Later that day, Yu-bong prepares medicine for Song-hwa and has her drink the concoction. A few days later while traveling, Song-hwa falls and admits that she has turned blind. Yu-bong takes her in his arms and brings her to a lodging near Baekyenosa Temple. By the window, Yu-bong combs Song-hwa's hair and tells her that the sun is up but the air is heavy with morning fog. Later that night, Song-hwa tells Yu-bong that she wants to learn to sing Simcheongga. Yu-bong begins to instruct Song-hwa but critiques her for not having enough despair and emotion in her voice. The father and daughter travel across snow, Yu-bong leading Song-hwa by a rope while Song-hwa practices daily in the freezing snow, singing towards the empty valley and mountain. Yu-bong tells Song-hwa that sorrow is accumulated throughout one's lifetime. He questions why the blind and orphaned Song-hwa still has no sorrow in her voice. Time passes and the frail, sick Yu-bong is on his deathbed with Song-hwa by his side. Yu-bong admits to Song-hwa that he was responsible for blinding her and asks for forgiveness. Many years later, the calligrapher travels to an inn where Song-hwa is staying. He recognizes her singing and is shocked at her blindness. She asks him to write her name for her, expressing that she can see with her heart despite being blind.

Dong-ho, having had the calligrapher point him to the inn, also arrives at the inn. He meets Song-hwa and requests a song. Song-hwa sings Shimcheongga with Dong-ho accompanying her throughout the entire night. In the morning, Dong-ho leaves. The innkeeper asks Song-hwa if Dong-ho is the brother she has been waiting for. Song-hwa nods and admits that she knew at once the man was Dong-ho. Song-hwa tells the innkeeper that she has stayed for 3 years already and needs to move on. Reluctant, the innkeeper jokes that he is back to being a widower and asks Song-hwa to give him her address after she finds her next location.

Song-hwa begins her journey through the snow. A young girl holds the rope to lead Song-hwa.

Cast 

 Oh Jung-hae as Song-hwa, a young pansori singer and Yu-bong's adoptive daughter. She dedicates her life to pansori and following Yu-bong's vision of pansori artistry.
 Kim Myung-gon as Yu-bong, a pansori singer who tries to pass on his technique and vision of pansori to his adoptive children.
 Kim Kyu-chul as Dong-ho, Yu-bong's adoptive son who learns to be a pansori gosu. He later runs away from Yu-bong's abuse and the impoverished situation of his adoptive family.

Release 
For many decades, the Korean film market remained dominated by Hollywood imports and domestically produced films were not as well received. When Seopyonje was released April 1993, the film was expected to draw limited interest as well and was released on only one screen in Seoul. However, it immediately received positive reviews domestically within South Korea and by October, at the height of its popularity, it was shown domestically on only three screens at once in the entire city of over 10 million. Nevertheless, it ended up breaking box-office records and became the first Korean film to draw over a million viewers in Seoul alone. Seopyonnje also found its way to screens at art theatres and college campuses in the United States, Europe, and Japan. When it was released, Seopyonje'''s success also increased interest in pansori among modern audiences. The film was acclaimed critically, both in South Korea and abroad, getting screened in Cannes Film Festival (1993), winning six Grand Bell Awards (2002), an honorary Golden Bear Award at Berlin Film Festival, and six Korean Film Critics' Awards.

Due to the success of Seopyonje, Director Im Kwon-taek also used pansori as a narrative tool in his later films Chunhyang (2000), based on the popular Korean story Chunhyangga, and Beyond the Years (2007), an informal sequel to Seopyeonje.

 Critical Responses Seopyonje'' has received numerous attention by film critics and academics. Film critic Julian Stringer points out that the film's "use of structural ambiguities, or antinomies, [may] resonate differently for different audiences depending upon their cultural expectations and competencies". Common themes explored by film academics include concepts of national cinema, cultural nationalism, modernization, and gender. Kim Shin-Dong identified a set of binary oppositions between modern and traditional elements in the film such as cinema and pansori, technology and body, foreign and local, and artificial and natural, arguing that the film's simple narrative further emphasizes "the tension between the modern and the traditional (...) [with] the modern [as a] threat to the traditional art, culture, sprits, and values". Choi Chung-moo examined the film's politics of gender and body, reading Yu-bong's violence towards Song-hwa and Dong-ho as well as the alluded incest and rape of Yu-bong towards Song-hwa as response to the "deprivation of national identity and loss of masculinity by inflicting violence on colonized indigenous woman or onto the emasculated self".

Accolades

References

Bibliography

 

Adam Hartzell's review at koreanfilm.org

Related Links 

 Pansori
 Chunhyangga
 Simcheongga
 Music of Korea
 Korean Culture
 Arirang
 Korean Wave
 Chunhyang (2000 film)

External links 
 
 
 

1993 films
1990s musical drama films
South Korean historical drama films
South Korean musical drama films
Films about music and musicians
Films about blind people
Films set in the 1960s
Films based on Korean novels
Films directed by Im Kwon-taek
Best Picture Blue Dragon Film Award winners
Best Picture Grand Bell Award winners
1990s Korean-language films
1993 drama films